The Porumbacu (in its upper course also: Valea Sărății and Valea Mare) is a left tributary of the river Olt in Romania. It discharges into the Olt in Porumbacu de Jos. Its source is at the northern slope of Negoiu Peak, Făgăraș Mountains.

References

Rivers of Romania
Rivers of Sibiu County